The Angels Advocate Tour was the seventh concert tour by American singer-songwriter Mariah Carey. The tour supported her twelfth studio album, Memoirs of an Imperfect Angel (2009). The tour played 26 shows, primarily visiting the United States, eastern Canada and also Egypt, Brazil and Singapore. It began December 31, 2009 in New York City, New York and concluded on September 26, 2010 in Singapore. The tour grossed $9.1 million, selling 88,930 tickets.

Background 
After performing a set of promotional shows at The Pearl Concert Theater, rumors circulated in the media of Carey's forthcoming arena tour. In December 2009, the tour was official announced by Carey's official website and Twitter page, under the title "Angels' Advocate Tour". The name is linked to a song from her recent album Memoirs of an Imperfect Angel, "Angels Cry" which has since been remixed to feature Ne-Yo and released while Carey was on tour. This was her first concert tour since her The Adventures of Mimi Tour in 2006. Dates were only slated for the U.S., Canada, and a private concert in Egypt.

Critical reception 
The tour has been generally positive, with most reviewers admiring Carey's  live vocals. A review from The Palm Beach Post described Carey's vocals as being "strong, assured and, as usual, eerily effortless"  a sentiment that was additionally reflected in Chris Azzopardi's review of the Detroit date for Pride Source that commented; "You attend a Mariah Carey concert to be in the dreamlike presence of a super-diva, not expecting to be wooed by artful razzle-dazzle or the singer's dexterous dance moves. Those aerobics are in her voice, a supreme many-octave instrument that worked for 95 minutes during her "Angels Advocate Tour" Monday at the Fox Theatre in Detroit." Lauren Carter of the Boston Herald also praised Carey's vocals, stating that "'My All,' the gospel-inspired 'Fly Like a Bird' and early career hit 'Emotions' were all powerhouse stunners, boasting the mix of smoky tones, soulful trills and high-octave whistles that have become her trademark." Critics praised Carey's ability to vocally deliver despite experiencing a cold on several dates with Jason Richards of Toronto Now's article aptly titled 'Mariah fights through cold for ACC performance' commenting that "Mariah Carey's cold was a running theme at the singer's Air Canada Centre show", before going on to say "It's a testament to her vocal talent, then, that Mariah still managed to flex her legendary five-octave range throughout the night."

The set design and set list have also been praised, in particular the mix of "Love Hangover"/"Heartbreaker" and her performances of "We Belong Together" and "Hero". Carey's between-song banter has also been the subject of much praise with an MTV review commenting that "Throughout the night, her between-song banter felt light, honest and steadfastly lucid, in stark contrast to recent well-publicized bouts of public babbling. Her intimate connection with her fans was palpable from start to finish." A review from the Los Angeles Times stated "her transparent blend of vocal talent and goofy charisma seems appealingly old-fashioned." Sarah Rodman from The Boston Globe commented that the show was "precisely that mix of diva and daffiness that endears Carey to her fans and that worked to make the hour-and-40-minute show a captivating mix of sparkle, silliness, and vocal pyrotechnics."

Set list 
The following set list is from the  December 31, 2009 concert in New York City. It is not intended to represent all dates throughout the tour.

 "Butterfly / Daydream Interlude (Fantasy Sweet Dub Mix)" (Introduction)
 "All I Want for Christmas Is You" 
 "Shake It Off"
 "Touch My Body"
 "H.A.T.E.U."
 "Make It Happen" (Dance Interlude)
 "Angels Cry"
 "Subtle Invitation"
 "It's Like That" (With elements of "Sucker MC's" and "Hollis Crew")
 "Rock with You" (Interlude) (Performed by Trey Lorenz)
 "Love Hangover" / "Heartbreaker (Diva Remix)"
 "We Belong Together" 
 "Fantasy" 
 "Auld Lang Syne"
 "Obsessed"
"Migrate"
"More Than Just Friends"
"Emotions"
 "Always Be My Baby"
Encore
"Hero"
 "Hero Reprise" (Outro)

Shows

Cancelled shows

Personnel 
Eric Daniels – musical director, keyboards
Peter Dyer – keyboards
Lance Tolbert - bass
Bennie Rodgers – drums
Trey Lorenz – background vocals
Mary Ann Tatum – background vocals
Sherry Tatum - background vocals
Takeytha Johnson – background vocals

References

External links
 Carey's Official Site

Mariah Carey concert tours
2009 concert tours
2010 concert tours
Mariah Carey